James William Jordan (January 13, 1908 – December 4, 1957) was an American baseball player whose career in the major leagues lasted from April 20, 1933, to September 27, 1936.

He subsequently played for Topeka, Dayton, Houston, Greensboro, Rochester and Jersey City before spending four seasons with the Brooklyn Dodgers as a second baseman and shortstop. Following his stint with the Dodgers, he served as a manager of the Hutchinson Pirates and London Pirates.

Jimmy Jordan died at his home in Charlotte, North Carolina five-and-a-half weeks before his 50th birthday.

References

Notes

External links

Major League Baseball second basemen
Major League Baseball shortstops
Baseball players from South Carolina
Brooklyn Dodgers players
People from Spartanburg County, South Carolina
1908 births
1957 deaths
Minor league baseball managers
Cambridge Canners players
Spartanburg Spartans players
Topeka Jayhawks players
Dayton Aviators players
Houston Buffaloes players
Greensboro Patriots players
Rochester Red Wings players
Jersey City Skeeters players
Columbus Red Birds players
Memphis Chickasaws players
Knoxville Smokies players
Hutchinson Pirates players
London Pirates players